Iryna Nozdrovska (January 27, 1979, Demydiv, Kyiv Oblast, URSR – c. December 29, 2017, Vyshhorod Raion, Ukraine) was a Ukrainian lawyer. In 2015 her sister was killed by a car driven by Dmitry Rossoshansky, the nephew of a Kyiv judge. Nozdrovska worked on bringing Rossoshansky to justice, and in May 2017 he was jailed for seven years.

Nozdrovska was reported missing on December 29, 2017. Her body was found in a river outside Kyiv on January 1, 2018, and a murder investigation was opened. An autopsy revealed multiple stab wounds in her neck.

Death of sister
In 2015 Nozdrovska's sister was struck and killed by Dmitry Rossoshansky, the nephew of a Kyiv judge. In May 2017 Rossoshansky was jailed for seven years. Nozdrovska's lawyer, Vitaly Matselyuk said the high-profile nature of this case forced the Kyiv authorities to act. "Without the media, it may have gone nowhere," he said. Rossoshansky's appeal was rejected on December 27, 2017. Two days later, on December 29, Nozdrovska disappeared.

See also
List of solved missing person cases
List of unsolved murders

Notes

1979 births
2010s missing person cases
2017 deaths
Female murder victims
Formerly missing people
Missing person cases in Ukraine
People murdered in Ukraine
Ukrainian women lawyers
Unsolved murders in Ukraine
21st-century Ukrainian lawyers
Violence against women in Ukraine
2017 murders in Ukraine